Piateda is a comune (municipality) in the Province of Sondrio in the Italian region Lombardy, located about  northeast of Milan and about  east of Sondrio.

Piateda borders the following municipalities: Albosaggia, Caiolo, Carona, Faedo Valtellino, Montagna in Valtellina, Poggiridenti, Ponte in Valtellina, Tresivio, Valbondione.

It is located alongside the Adda river.

Demographic evolution

References

External links
 www.comune.piateda.so.it

Cities and towns in Lombardy